Forget Me Not is a 1935 German drama film directed by Augusto Genina and starring Beniamino Gigli, Peter Bosse and Kurt Vespermann. The rights to the film were bought by Alexander Korda who remade it in Britain the following year.

Main cast
 Beniamino Gigli as Enzo Curti - tenor Scala of Milano
 Peter Bosse as Benvenuto - His son
 Kurt Vespermann as Ernst Mülmann - Curtis Impresario
 F.W. Schröder-Schrom as Geheimrat von Berneck
 Magda Schneider as Liselotte Heßfeld - seine Sekretärin
 Siegfried Schürenberg as Hellmut von Ahrens - Erster Offizier
 Erik Ode as Peter Petermann, Dritter Offizier
 Hedda Bjornson as Irene Hart
 Zoya Valevskaya as Olga

Citations

General bibliography 
 Kulik, Karol. Alexander Korda: The Man Who Could Work Miracles. Virgin Books, 1990.

External links

1935 films
Films of Nazi Germany
German drama films
German black-and-white films
1935 drama films
1930s German-language films
Films directed by Augusto Genina
1930s German films